Secret Beach, officially known as Kauapea Beach, is a beach in Kalihiwai and Kīlauea on the north shore of the island of Kauai, Hawaii.  The beach is known for its size, seclusion, and beauty.

Location
Secret Beach is located approximately one-half mile northwest of the town of Kilauea and is situated between the Kilauea Lighthouse and Kalihiwai Valley.  As its name suggests, the beach is not easily accessible and no public roads lead to it.  To find it, take the Kuhio Highway past Kilauea and turn right on Kalihiwai Road.  Follow the road for about 50 yards and then turn right into an unmarked, unpaved road.  Proceed to the end and park.  Nearby is the footpath leading to the west end of the beach.

Trail Conditions

The trail winds steeply downhill through brush and may be barely discernible in places.  The hike takes about 10 minutes in good weather.  On rainy days and particularly in the winter, the trail is dangerously slick.  Be prepared to be covered in reddish hued clay that is notoriously difficult to remove from clothing.  Locals recommend braving the hike either barefoot or using Neoprene booties that kayaking enthusiasts tend to use. Since the return requires hiking back up the same path, most visitors will want to come on a dry day to avoid these conditions.

Topography

Secret Beach is quite large by Hawaiian standards, approximately 3000 feet long and 75 feet wide.  Its surface is predominantly covered with fine white sand and with outcrops of black lava rock.  The beach’s seclusion and beauty are further enhanced by the cliff backdrop and the brilliant turquoise-colored ocean water in the foreground.  The cliff face, notably on the east and west ends of the beach, is sheer red and black rock.  Where the gradient is less steep, the cliff is covered with lush vegetation, consisting of ironwood trees, taro plants, and other tropical plants.  Also there are several small cascading waterfalls.

Clearly visible to the east is Kilauea Lighthouse set atop a cliff that faces Moku'ae'ae Island.  About a quarter mile beyond the west end of the beach is a substantial waterfall that plunges about 15 feet into the Pacific Ocean.

The ocean floor is mostly sand-covered and its descent is steep.

Activities
Water conditions at the beach vary by season.  Although the beach is accessible year round, swimming is only advisable in the summer and even then swimming can be risky when the surf is high or rough because of strong, unpredictable currents.  In winter the surf is turbulent and dangerous; accordingly, swimming is not recommended for anyone who is inexperienced under these conditions.

Other beach activities include picnicking, seashell hunting, surfing, sunbathing, snorkeling, and fishing.  Also tidal lagoons form on the west end of the beach, offering a kind of kiddie pool.  There are no facilities at the beach, so visitors must bring their own food and beverages.

Naturism
Secret Beach has for many years attracted nude sunbathers, particularly toward the east and west ends of the beach. Although public nudity is not legal in Hawaii and despite the beach’s reputation, the beach is rarely patrolled and no one seems much concerned with the practice. In the rare instances that patrols are conducted, violators will invariably just be asked to dress.

References

External links

 http://www.djhome.net/kauai/beaches/Secret.htm
Kauapea Secret Beach, Kauai

Beaches of Kauai
Nude beaches